Pontevedra Club de Fútbol, S.A.D. is a Spanish football team in Pontevedra, in the autonomous community of Galicia. Founded on 16 October 1941 it currently plays in Primera División RFEF – Group 1, holding home matches at Estadio Municipal de Pasarón, with a capacity of 10,500 seats.

Having enjoyed its heyday in the 1960s, it even reached the First Division, leading it during November and December 1965.

History
Pontevedra Club de Fútbol was founded in 1941, following the merge of the two top teams in the city at the time: Eiriña FC and Alfonso XIII CF The first president of the new club was Fernando Ponte Conde.

Pontevedra promoted to La Liga in 1963 but was relegated a year after, managing to play again in the top flight between 1965 and 1970. During this time the fans coined the motto Hai que roelo, in reference to the difficulties rival teams had when playing a strong side, who achieved a seventh place in 1966, adding an eighth two seasons later; midfielder Ignacio Martín-Esperanza and forwards Neme and Roldán were among the stars of this era, and years following the 1972–73 season saw the team more often than not struggling in lower categories, well into the 2000s.

Pontevedra returned to the Segunda División after 20 years on 27 June 2004, after winning their Segunda División B group and defeating Lorca Deportiva CF on the final day of the playoffs. The team struggled in their one year back in national professional football, finishing dead last but winning 4–1 at home in their final fixture against fellow relegated team UD Salamanca.

On 23 January 2007 Pontevedra was transformed into a Sociedad Anónima Deportiva (sporting Joint stock company), as required by Spanish law – this was a general measure introduced in order to revitalise the financial situation of professional football clubs. Yet, some risked disappearance as they could not face the cost involved in this transformation from "private" to "stock company". In the club's case this was made possible after then president, Nino Mirón, had purchased 52 per cent of the stock options; the club then added the letters "S.A.D." to its official name.

In 2010–11, Pontevedra had the stated aim of returning to the second tier, but following an economic crisis that saw them sell Brazilian star Igor de Souza, the team were relegated to the Tercera División for the first time in 27 years; relegation was sealed with a 5–1 home defeat to CD Guadalajara. Four years later, the team bounced back, winning their group before defeating Haro Deportivo 3–1 on aggregate in the play-off final.

Season to season

6 seasons in La Liga
9 seasons in Segunda División
1 season in Primera División RFEF
36 seasons in Segunda División B
1 season in Segunda División RFEF
26 seasons in Tercera División
2 seasons in Categorías Regionales

Current squad
.

Reserve team

Out of loan

Honours/achievements
Segunda División: 1962–63, 1964–65
Segunda División B: 2003–04, 2006–07
Tercera División: 1946–47, 1947–48, 1959–60, 1975–76, 1981–82, 1982–83, 1983–84, 2014–15
Copa Federación de España: 2007, 2018
Best results in La Liga: 7th in 1965–66, 8th in 1967–68

Colours and crest
The traditional colours of Pontevedra are burgundy shirt, blue shorts and burgundy socks. However, during certain periods white shorts and blue socks were also used, and even a blue and burgundy ribboned shirt for a short period of time.

The current colours are the traditional, with the crest of the club on the left upper part of the shirt. The name of the sponsor (if any) is normally placed in the centre of the shirt.

The crest is a fusion between the coat of arms of the city of Pontevedra and a football, displaying the name of the city/club and the letters "CF". The club has an official mascot called Roélio, a walking bone dressed in the club colours who is a direct reference to the club's motto.

Stadium

Pontevedra plays at the Estadio Municipal de Pasarón. With a 105x68 meters playing field, it was built in 1956 and was partially refitted for the 1982 FIFA World Cup celebrated in Spain; it did not hold any actual games in the tournament, but it benefitted from the general funds allocated to the refurbishment of football stadiums.
 
The stadium used to have a capacity for 16,500, including standing spectators. However, UEFA regulations dictated that all attendants must be seated and, therefore, the stadium went under re-construction. – regardless, Pasarón was also in need of a general refurbishment, overdue since 1982. The works were completed for the 2010–11 season, with the new capacity being of 10,500 spectators.

Pasarón is located in the north side of the city (north to Lérez River), at Rúa de Luis Otero s/n, 36005. The stadium is owned by the local city council, the Concello de Pontevedra.

Famous players

See also
Pontevedra CF B, the reserve team.

References

External links
Official website 
Futbolme team profile 
Unofficial site 
Furya Granate, ultras blog 
Furya Granate website 

 
Football clubs in Galicia (Spain)
Association football clubs established in 1941
1941 establishments in Spain
Segunda División clubs
La Liga clubs
Primera Federación clubs
Pontevedra